St.Paulose Mor Athanasios , popularly known as Aluvayile Valiya Thirumeni, was the Metropolitan of the Angamaly Diocese and malankara Metropolitan of the Malankara Jacobite Syrian Orthodox Church.

The Feast of Mor Athanasius is held annually on 26 January.

Career
On 25 November 1898, Valiya Thirumeni was ordained as a priest (Kassisso) by Saint Geevarghese Mar Gregorios Chathuruthiyil.  On 28 November, he was elevated to monk (ramban) by  the then Malankara Metropolitan Pulikkottil  Mar Dionysius 5 ,  Geevarghese Mar Gregorios Chathuruthiyil and   Kadavil Paulose Mar Athanasios .

In December 1917, head of Patriarch faction  Kochuparambil Paulose Mor Koorilos died, Valiya Thirumeni was selected to lead the Patriarch Faction of Malankara Church.  He took office in January 1918.

Thirumeni also founded the Brotherhood of St. Antonios and the St. Mary's Sisterhood, with the aim of building a base for the monastic movement in Malankara. He also encouraged the development of a centre for theological studies at Thrikkunnathu Seminary.

In 1931, Patriarch Mor Ignatius Elias III visited India to strive for peace in the Malankara Syrian church. Thirumeni accompanied  Patriarch Mor Ignatius Elias 3 throughout the apostolic visit and participated in the meetings that were held with the aim of achieving a long-standing peace. However Patriarch Elias died before accomplishing his peace mission, and was entombed at the St. Ignatius Monastery, Manjinikkara. Thirumeni led the ceremony of the Patriarch's last rites

Patriarch Mor Ignatius Aphrem I Barsoum of the Apostolic See of Antioch and All the Eascalled e ihuremani the title "Defender of the True Faith" (Sathya Viswasa Samrakshakan) after he haledethe Patriarch Faction of the f Malankara Churrs.

Metropolitans ordained by / with the assistance of Paulose Mar Athanasius 
After  becoming metropolitan of Angamaly Diocese , the following Metropolitans were ordained to serve with him in the Malankara Church:

 Edavazhikkal Geevarghese Mar Severios, ordained as the first metropolitan of Knanaya diocese in August 1910 by Patriarch Ignatius Abded Aloho II. 
 Michael Mar Dionysius   ordained in 1926 by Patriarch Mor Ignatius Elias III.
 Augen Mar Thimotheos for Kandanad diocese, ordained in 1926 by Patriarch Mor Ignatius Elias III.
 Thoma Mar Dioscoros for Knanaya diocese, ordained in 1926 by Patriarch Mor Ignatius Elias III.

Mar Diascoros later joined the newly formed Syro-Malankara Catholic Church. Augen Mar Thimotheos later left to join the dissident Malankara Orthodox Church.

In 1945, due to his advancing age, Mar Athanasios requested additional help. Fr. Geevarghese Vayaliparambil and Ramban Paulose Mulayirickal were elected and consecrated bishops Geevarghese Mar Gregorios Vayaliparambil and Mulayirickal Paulose Mar Severios by Patriarch Ignatius Aphrem I.  Vayaliparambil Mar Gregorios served under Mar Athanasius in the Angamali diocese and Mar Severious was assigned to the Kochi diocese.

In 1951 Abraham Mor Clemis was ordained to the Knanaya diocese, and in 1952, Paulose Mor Philoxenos was consecrated.

He assumed the charge of the diocese just two weeks before the death of Mar Athanasios.

Death
Valiya Thirumeni died on 25 January 1953 at the age of 84. The next day he was buried at the northern side of the madbho (altar) of St. Mary's Church in  Thrikkunnathu Seminary.

Memorials
The Mar Athanasios College of Engineering at Kothamangalam, the Mar Athanasios High School at Nedumbassery,  and the Mar Athanasios English Medium School at Puthencuriz are all named after Valiya Thirumeni.  In 2006, the Mar Athanasios Cathedral was founded in Puthencruz.

The sandalwood cot presented to Valiya Thirumeni by his uncle is kept in a separate room of the office of his home parish, the Mor Sabor Mor Aphroth  jacobite Church at Akaparambu.

The celebration of Holy Qurbana on the 50th anniversary of the death of Mor Athanasios was presided over by Baselios Thomas I catholicose of the Jacobite Syrian Church assisted by the Metropolitans of the Jacobite Syrian Orthodox church, at St. Mary's Church in Aluva on 26 January 2003.

Beatification
Two miracles have been attributed to Valiya Thirumeni:

 A woman claimed to have suffered from haemorrhage for several years despite medical treatments.  She approached Valiya Thirumeni for help.  He prayed for her and she was reportedly healed of the disease.
 A man called Varkey claimed to have suffered from an evil spirit for 20 years.  Valiya Thirumeni placed his sleeba (cross) on the man's forehead and prayed for him.  The man claimed that he was immediately cured.

On 18 September 2009, the Patriarch signed bull No.152/2009.  It permitted the reciting of the name of St. Athanasius Paulose in the 5th Tubden.  Henceforth, he name was remembered in all Malankara Jacobite Syrian churches worldwide, after the names of St. Gregorios Abdul Jaleel and St. Osthatheos Sleeba.

The bull was read at the Kothamangalam Mar Thoma Church on 2 October 2009 during the 324th memorial feast of Maphryono St. Baselios Yeldho in the presence of the Catholicos, the visiting Archbishop Mor Thimotheos Mousa Al Shamani of Nineveh and the Abbot of Mor Mattai Dayro, Mosul, Iraq and all the Metropolitans of the Jacobite Syrian Christian Church.

References

1869 births
1953 deaths
Indian Christian saints
Syriac Orthodox Church bishops
20th-century Oriental Orthodox bishops